SS James H. Kimball was a Liberty ship built in the United States during World War II. She was named after James H. Kimball, the chief meteorologist in the New York Weather Bureau.

Construction
James H. Kimball was laid down on 7 March 1944, under a Maritime Commission (MARCOM) contract, MC hull 2298, by J.A. Jones Construction, Panama City, Florida; she was launched on 22 April 1944.

History
She was allocated to American Export Lines, Inc., on 16 May 1944. On 26 November 1946, she was laid up in the National Defense Reserve Fleet, in Astoria, Oregon. On 11 April 1947, she was sold to Azuero Cia. Nav., for commercial service. On 24 December 1968, she ran aground in River Gironde, after she had engine trouble. She later broke in two and was declared a total loss.

References

Bibliography

 
 
 
 
 

 

Liberty ships
Ships built in Panama City, Florida
1944 ships
Maritime incidents in 1968
Astoria Reserve Fleet